William Peter Waite (known as Pete Waite) is an American volleyball coach and author, and is a former head coach for the women's volleyball team at Wisconsin.

Early life
Waite is a graduate of Monona Grove High School in Madison, Wisconsin. He attended Ball State University from 1977–81 and was a volleyball player there. Waite received All-MIVA honors his junior and senior years, and was named team co-captain and co-MVP in 1980. He received his bachelor's degree in education from Ball State in 1981.

Coaching career

High school coaching
He started his coaching career in 1981 at Northside High School in Muncie, Indiana and spent the next year as a junior varsity coach at his alma mater, Monona Grove High School. Waite also coached one year at Bremen High School in Midlothian, Illinois.

1984–85: Moraine Valley CC
Waite was the head coach at Moraine Valley Community College in Palos Hills, Illinois, leading the Cyclones to the 1985 North Central Community College Conference championship. Waite was named the conference coach of the year in 1985.

1986–87: Assistant coach
Waite was the assistant coach of Illinois State University in Normal, Illinois.

1988–98: Northern Illinois
Waite was the head coach at Northern Illinois University in DeKalb, Illinois, where  he was the winningest volleyball coach in program history. He had an 11-year record of 266–102. NIU appeared in four NCAA tournaments under Waite.
 
NIU won eight regular-season conference titles and six conference tournaments under Waite. Individually, Waite coached four AVCA all-region players, four conference players of the year, 14 first-team all-conference honorees, one conference newcomer of the year and four members of the conference all-newcomer team

1999–2012: Wisconsin

Waite is the all-time winningest volleyball coach in UW history, both in number of wins and winning percentage. Waite's teams  made nine straight NCAA tournament appearances before missing the 2008 NCAA Tournament, snapping the streak.

Under Waite, Wisconsin has won two Big Ten titles (2000 and 2001) and finished as NCAA National Runners-up to Nebraska.

At Wisconsin, Waite has coached 11 All-Americans, 17 AVCA All-Region first-team selections, two Big Ten Players of the Year and 20 first-team All-Big Ten honorees.

On November 26, 2012, Waite announced his resignation as head coach.

Books
Waite wrote chapter 22 of the Volleyball Coaching Bible, entitled "Giving Players and Teams the Competitive Edge". (Copyright 2002)
Waite published "Aggressive Volleyball", a 216-page book, in 2009.

Honors and awards

2006 – Big Ten co-Coach of the Year
2001 – AVCA Mideast Region Coach of the Year, Big Ten Coach of the Year
2000 – AVCA Mideast Region Coach of the Year, Big Ten Coach of the Year
1997 – Mid-American Conference Coach of the Year
1993 – Mid-Continent Conference Coach of the Year
1992 – Mid-Continent Conference Coach of the Year
1985 – North Central Community College Coach of the Year

References

External links
Pete Waite bio at UWbadgers.com

Living people
American volleyball coaches
American men's volleyball players
Wisconsin Badgers women's volleyball coaches
Sportspeople from Madison, Wisconsin
Ball State University alumni
Volleyball players from Indiana
Year of birth missing (living people)
Illinois State Redbirds women's volleyball coaches
Northern Illinois Huskies women's volleyball
Ball State Cardinals men's volleyball players